Top Darts is a darts video game developed by British studio Devil's Details for the PlayStation 3. It was released on the PlayStation Store on 21 December 2010.  The game features a large selection of traditional darts games as well as an assortment of unique challenges and multiplayer games.  It currently does not support online play.  The game features four different locations, each with its own themed dart board.  Players can also upload photos from their PS3 XMB as backgrounds for their own dart boards, and create their own avatar using the PlayStation Eye to insert their picture.

A PlayStation Vita version of the game was also announced to be in development. A video trailer has been released. Currently there is no date known and it is not known whether it is a retail title or available through digital download via the PlayStation Store.

References

2010 video games
PlayStation 3 games
PlayStation Network games
PlayStation Vita games
Sony Interactive Entertainment games
Darts video games
Video games developed in the United Kingdom